Omega Centauri (ω Cen, NGC 5139, or Caldwell 80) is a globular cluster in the constellation of Centaurus that was first identified as a non-stellar object by Edmond Halley in 1677. It is estimated to contain approximately 10 million stars, and a total mass equivalent to 4 million solar masses, making it the most massive-known globular cluster in the Milky Way.

Omega Centauri is very different from most other galactic globular clusters to the extent that it is thought to have originated as the core remnant of a disrupted dwarf galaxy.

Observation history
In 150 AD, Greco-Roman writer and astronomer Ptolemy catalogued this object in his Almagest as a star on the horse's back, "Quae est in principio scapulae". German cartographer Johann Bayer used Ptolemy's data to designate this object "Omega Centauri" with his 1603 publication of Uranometria. Using a telescope from the South Atlantic island of Saint Helena, English astronomer Edmond Halley rediscovered this object in 1677, listing it as a non-stellar object. In 1716, it was published by Halley among his list of six "luminous spots or patches" in the Philosophical Transactions of the Royal Society.

Swiss astronomer Jean-Philippe de Cheseaux included Omega Centauri in his 1746 list of 21 nebulae, as did French astronomer Lacaille in 1755, whence the catalogue number is designated L I.5. It was first recognized as a globular cluster by Scottish astronomer James Dunlop in 1826, who described it as a "beautiful globe of stars very gradually and moderately compressed to the centre".

Properties
It is the brightest, largest and, at 4 million solar masses, the most massive-known globular cluster associated with the Milky Way. Of all the globular clusters in the Local Group of galaxies, only Mayall II in the Andromeda Galaxy is brighter and more massive. Orbiting through the Milky Way, Omega Centauri contains several million Population II stars and is about 12 billion years old.

The stars in the core of Omega Centauri are so crowded that they are estimated to average only 0.1 light-year away from each other. The internal dynamics have been analyzed using measurements of the radial velocities of 469 stars. The members of this cluster are orbiting the center of mass with a peak velocity dispersion of 7.9 km s−1. The mass distribution inferred from the kinematics is slightly more extended than, though not strongly inconsistent with, the luminosity distribution.

Evidence of a central black hole

A 2008 study presented evidence for an intermediate-mass black hole at the center of Omega Centauri, based on observations made by the Hubble Space Telescope and Gemini Observatory on Cerro Pachón in Chile. Hubble's Advanced Camera for Surveys showed that stars are bunching up near the center of Omega Centauri, as evidenced by the gradual increase in starlight near the center. Using instruments at the Gemini Observatory to measure the speed of stars swirling in the cluster's core, E. Noyola and colleagues found that stars closer to the core are moving faster than stars farther away. This measurement was interpreted to mean that unseen matter at the core is interacting gravitationally with nearby stars. By comparing these results with standard models, the astronomers concluded that the most likely cause was the gravitational pull of a dense, massive object such as a black hole. They calculated the object's mass at 40,000 solar masses.

More recent work has challenged conclusions that there is a black hole in the cluster's core, in particular disputing the proposed location of the cluster center. Calculations using a revised location for the center found that the velocity of core stars does not vary with distance, as would be expected if an intermediate-mass black hole were present. The same studies also found that starlight does not increase toward the center but instead remains relatively constant. The authors noted that their results do not entirely rule out the black hole proposed by Noyola and colleagues, but they do not confirm it, and they limit its maximum mass to 12,000 solar masses.

Disrupted dwarf galaxy
It has been speculated that Omega Centauri is the core of a dwarf galaxy that was disrupted and absorbed by the Milky Way. Indeed, Kapteyn's Star, which is currently only 13 light-years away from Earth, is thought to originate from Omega Centauri. Omega Centauri's chemistry and motion in the Milky Way are also consistent with this picture. Like Mayall II, Omega Centauri has a range of metallicities and stellar ages that suggests that it did not all form at once (as globular clusters are thought to form) and may in fact be the remainder of the core of a smaller galaxy long since incorporated into the Milky Way.

In fiction
The novel Singularity (2012), by Ian Douglas, presents as fact that Omega Centauri and Kapteyn's Star originate from a disrupted dwarf galaxy, and this origin is central to the novel's plot. A number of scientific aspects of Omega Centauri are discussed as the story progresses, including the likely radiation environment inside the cluster and what the sky might look like from inside the cluster.

This cluster figures in the German pulp science-fiction series Perry Rhodan, and a cycle of the spin-off series Atlan, is set in Omega Centauri.

See also
 Canis Major Overdensity
 Mayall II
 Messier 54
 NGC 5286
 Sagittarius Dwarf Spheroidal Galaxy
 Fimbulthul stream

References

Further reading

External links

 StarDate: Omega Centauri Fact Sheet
 Hubblesite - Peering into the core of a globular cluster
 Omega Centauri: Former Core of a Dwarf Galaxy?
 Omega Centauri: Proud Cluster or Sad Remnant? 
 Omega Centauri at ESA/Hubble - link not operational 
 Omega Centauri on Wikisky.org - Link not operational
 Omega Centauri, Galactic Globular Clusters Database page
 
 Omega Centauri at Constellation Guide
 SEDS – NGC 5139

Globular clusters
Centaurus (constellation)
Centauri, Omega
NGC objects
080b
Astronomical objects known since antiquity
Intermediate-mass black holes